The Queen's Platinum Jubilee Beacons were lit on 2 June 2022 throughout the United Kingdom, Channel Islands, Isle of Man and British Overseas Territories and each of the capital cities of Commonwealth countries, in celebration of the Platinum Jubilee of Queen Elizabeth II.

It followed the United Kingdom's long tradition of celebrating royal jubilees, weddings and coronations with the lighting of beacons.

A Commonwealth Song was sung by choirs all over the world to coincide exactly with the lighting of The Queen's Platinum Jubilee Beacons in all the 54 countries of the Commonwealth.

Locations
An estimated 3,500 Jubilee Beacons were lit throughout the United Kingdom, Channel Islands, Isle of Man and British Overseas Territories.

For the first time, Jubilee beacons were also lit in each of the capital cities of Commonwealth nations throughout various time zones in 2022. Commonwealth countries with their capitals are listed below:

Song for the Commonwealth
A song was written to celebrate the Platinum Jubilee and was sung alongside the lighting of the Beacons around the UK and across the Commonwealth. Organised by the Commonwealth Resounds, hundreds of choirs joined to sing A Life Lived with Grace. The song was put together after a call for lyrics and subsequent compositions was won by Lucy Kiely and Vincent Atueyi from Australia and Nigeria, respectively.

The competition for the song was judged by:
The Rt Hon. Patricia Scotland QC, Commonwealth Secretary-General
Roderick Williams OBE, Baritone
Judith Weir CBE, Master of the Queen's Music
Alison Cox, Founder and Chair of Trustees, The Commonwealth Resounds / Head of Composition, The Purcell School for Young Musicians.
Bruno Peek LVO, OBE, OPR
Anne T. Gallagher AO Director General of the Commonwealth Foundation
Graham Trew Baritone & Former Chairman of The Association of English Singers and Speakers

See also
Diamond Jubilee of Elizabeth II
Platinum Party at the Palace
Platinum Jubilee Pageant

Notes

References

Beacons
2022 in the United Kingdom
History of the Commonwealth of Nations
Commonwealth realms
Monarchy in Canada
Monarchy in Australia
Monarchy in New Zealand
Elizabeth II
Events involving British royalty
June 2022 events in the United Kingdom